Linde Ivimey (born 1965) is an Australian sculptor.

Biography 
Linde Ivimey was born in Sydney, Australia and obtained a Diploma of Fine Art in both printmaking and sculpture at the Claremont School of Art in Perth. She taught at the school from 1993 to 1995 and also lectured at the West Australian School of Art from 1996 to 1998. In 2003, her debut exhibition at Melbourne’s Heide Museum of Modern Art proved critically and financially successful.

Since her debut, Ivimey has participated in notable exhibitions such as Bone Idol in Berlin, Germany (2014), the Blake Prize for Religious Art (2000), in Sydney; and Materiality at Royal Melbourne Institute of Technology Gallery (1999), to name a few. Prizes received include Gomboc Sculpture Award (1992), the SECWA Fremantle Art Award (1991), and Friends of Dorothy Award for Sculpture, Perth. Her collections can be seen in many galleries including: National Gallery of Victoria, National Gallery of Australia, HOTA - Home of the Arts, University of Queensland Art Museum, Rockhampton Museum of Art and Hugo Collection.

Ivimey considers herself a visual artist. She is well known for her use of recycled materials, often incorporating bone and skin, primarily that of bird, sheep and fish, into large scale statues and small detailed figures. She draws upon many skills from welding to cooking, weaving, wood-sculpture, and sewing. To some her work is considered macabre. Her reaction to this was recorded as saying “I can accept they’re a little bit macabre and confronting,” she states. “But when people say ‘oh, that’s weird, I couldn’t stand that in my home’, I gently remind them that I’m not that keen on floral couches, but if they’ve invited me to sit on one, I’m not going to tell them.”

Personal life 

In 2013, Ivimey was diagnosed with breast cancer, and hinted at this in her solo show Brave to the Bone at Martin Browne Contemporary in Sydney. One of the sculptures entitled Bandaid Bunny (a self portrait) appears admitted and sitting in a doctor’s waiting room. Other works related to her experience of depression while ill, with the "black dog" featuring heavily. After the show, Ivimey began cataloging her work as "BC" and "AD", which she explained as "before cancer and after diagnosis".

Solo exhibitions 
2021

Bonafides, Jan Murphy Gallery, Brisbane

Objects within, HOTA-Home of the Arts, Gold Coast

2018 

Conversations with a caterpillar, Jan Murphy Gallery, Brisbane 

2017 

The Shape of Things, Martin Browne Contemporary, Sydney 

2015 

Cross My Heart, Jan Murphy Gallery, Brisbane 

2014 

Bone Idol, Michael Reid, Berlin 

Brave to the Bone, Martin Browne Contemporary, Sydney 

2013 

Highlights from ‘If Pain Persists’, Cairns Regional Gallery, QLD 

2012 

If Pain Persists: Linde Ivimey Sculpture, University of Queensland Art Museum, Brisbane 

Take Two, Jan Murphy Gallery, Brisbane 

Set in Bone, Martin Browne Fine Art, Sydney 

2009 

New Works, Martin Browne Fine Art, Sydney 

2007 

New Works, Martin Browne Fine Art, Sydney 

2006 

Only the Memory, Gould Galleries, Melbourne 

Old Souls ~ New Work, Martin Browne Fine Art, Sydney 

2003 

Close to the Bone, Heide Museum of Modern Art, Melbourne

Selected group exhibitions 

2022 

Form, Bundaberg Regional Art Gallery, QLD 

Welcome Home, Rockhampton Museum of Art, QLD 

2021 

HOTA Collects – Linde Ivimey: objects within, HOTA - Home of the Arts, QLD

Savour, Bundaberg Regional Art Gallery, QLD 

2019 

Love, Tweed Regional Gallery, NSW 

Counterparts, Rockhampton Art Gallery, QLD 

TRACE, West End (multiple locations), Brisbane 

2018 

The Erskine Pledge: a gift to Newcastle, Newcastle Art Gallery, Newcastle 

Jan Murphy Gallery, spring 1883, Melbourne 

So Fine – Contemporary women artists make Australian history, National Portrait Gallery, Canberra 

The Gift: Art, Artefacts and Arrivals, Museum of Australian Democracy, Canberra 

2017 

Apologies to Roadkill, Godinyamayin Yijard Rivers Arts & Cultural Centre, NT 

2016 

Jan Murphy Gallery, spring 1883, Melbourne 

Ceremonial, Craft Victoria, Melbourne 

Love…more than a four letter word, Caboolture Regional Gallery, QLD 

I Prefer Life: works from the Reydan Weiss collection, Weserburg, Bremen, Germany 

We Are Here: An exploration of contemporary portraiture as a response to hatred and hope, Glen Eira City Council Gallery, VIC 

Hidden: Rookwood Cemetery Sculpture Walk, Rookwood Cemetery, NSW 

2015 

Fantastic Worlds, Rockhampton Art Gallery, QLD 

Discerning Judgement, Supreme Court Library Queensland, Brisbane 

Martin Browne Contemporary, art central, Hong Kong 

Australian Contemporary Art, Australian Embassy Berlin

2014 

12 Days of Christmas, Jan Murphy Gallery, Brisbane 

2013 

Martin Browne Contemporary, Auckland Art Fair

Martin Browne Contemporary, Sydney Contemporary Art Fair

Australia: Contemporary voices, Fine Art Society, London 

Gathering II, Wangaratta Regional Gallery, VIC 

Diorama, Woollongong Regional Art Gallery, VIC 

Sculpture at Bathers Beach, Kidogo House, Perth 

2012 

Walking With Alice, South Australian School of Art, Adelaide 

Multiply, Hastings City Art Gallery, Hawkes Bay, New Zealand 

Hello Dollies, Penrith Regional Art Gallery, NSW 

Murr-mur, Michael Reid, Berlin 

2011 

Martin Browne Fine Art, Auckland Art Fair

2010 

Martin Browne Fine Art, Melbourne Art Fair

2009 

University of Queensland National Artists’ Self-Portrait Prize, University of Queensland Art Museum, Brisbane 

Martin Browne Fine Art, Auckland Art Fair

Women In The Bible, The Jewish Museum, Melbourne 

2008 

Autumn Catalogue, Martin Browne Fine Art, Sydney 

New Works by Gallery Artists, Martin Browne Fine Art, Sydney 

Melbourne Art Fair, Martin Browne Fine Art

Bal Taschit, The Jewish Museum, Melbourne 

2007 

Winter Catalogue, Martin Browne Fine Art, Sydney 

Autumn Catalogue, Martin Browne Fine Art, Sydney 

Summer Exhibition, Martin Browne Fine Art, Sydney 

Blood Lines, Hawkesbury Regional Gallery, NSW (followed by national tour) 

Culture Trackers, 24 Hour Art Centre, Darwin 

Martin Browne Fine Art, Auckland Art Fair

2006 

Summer Exhibition, Martin Browne Fine Art, Sydney 

Strange Cargo: Contemporary Art As A State Of Encounter, Newcastle Regional Gallery, NSW (followed by national tour) 

2005 

Martin Browne Fine Art, Auckland Art Fair

Bread, Bones & Babies, Blindside, Melbourne 

Natural Selection, Linden Gallery, Melbourne 

New Haven, Uber Gallery, Melbourne 

2004 

Martin Browne Fine Art, Melbourne Art Fair

Heavenly Creatures, Heide Museum of Modern Art, Melbourne 

2003 

National Sculpture Prize & Exhibition, National Gallery of Australia, Canberra 

The Makers Craft, Counihan Gallery, Melbourne 

2001 

National Sculpture Prize & Exhibition, National Gallery of Australia, Canberra 

Menagerie, The Gold Treasury Museum, Melbourne 

2000 

The Blake Prize for Religious Art, S.H Ervin Gallery, Sydney 

Sculpture Survey, Gomboc Sculpture Gallery, Perth 

1999 

Materiality, RMIT Project Space, Melbourne 

The Tactile Art Award, Object Galleries, Customs House, Sydney 

1998 

Gomboc Gallery, Australian Contemporary Art Fair, Perth 

Exhibition Buildings, Melbourne 

Millennium, Gomboc Sculpture Gallery, Perth 

1997 

Aspects of Fremantle, The Mores Building, WA 

I, Shadow, Australian Galleries, Melbourne Festival 

New Collections Gallery, Perth 

1996 

Sculpture Survey, Gomboc Sculpture Gallery, Perth 

Bravado, Delaney Galleries, Perth 

Field Day, Ballidu Contemporary Art Society, WA

Eggsamples, WA Ostrich Company, Perth 

The Monaro Show, Fremantle Art Centre, WA 

1995 

Plot, Kalla Yeedip Gallery, WA 

Substantial Stuff, CSA Gallery, Perth 

Homocraft, Craftwest Gallery, Perth (followed by national tour) 

1994 

In Spirit & Form, Bunbury Galleries, Bunbury, WA 

1993 

Taugman, The Ties That Bind, Perth Institute of Contemporary Art, WA and The Australian Centre, Manila 

Life Size, Lawrence Wilson Gallery, Perth 

Heavier Than Air, Perth Institute of Contemporary Art, WA 

Skin, Perth Institute of Contemporary Art, WA 

1992 

Advantages Of Isolation, Blaxland Gallery, Sydney 

When I’m 69, Delaney Galleries, Perth, WA 

Body Contact, Perth Gallery, WA 

Nexus, Access Contemporary Gallery, NSW 

City Challenge, Art Gallery of Western Fremantle Art Award, Energy Museum, WA 

National Womens Arts Festival, Tin Sheds Gallery, Sydney 

Please Be Seated, Museum Of Western Australia, Perth

Publications 

50 Most collectable Artists, Australian Art Collector, Issue 51, p. 206, January- March 2010
Collins Artists Diary, 2010
50 Most collectable Artists, Australian Art Collector, Issue 47, January- March 2009
Boccalate, Suzanne. Hair, Trunkbooks, Series 1, pp. 37- 41, May 2009
What Now, Australian Art Collector, Issue 48, pp. 106- 107, April- June 2009
50 Most Collectable Artists, Australian Art Collector, Issue 43, pp. 144- 147, January–March 2008
McDonald, John. From Eerie to Equine, Sydney Morning Herald (Spectrum), pp. 16 –17, 29 September 2007
Baum, Caroline. Linde Ivimey: From Birth to Earth, Sydney Morning Herald (Spectrum), 3 September 2007
McCulloch, Alan Susan and Emily, Linde Ivimey in The New McCulloch’s Encyclopedia of Australian Art, Australian Art Editions, p. 545, The Miegunyah Press 2006
Clarke, Deborah. Front Cover Art Monthly, number 191, July 2006
Mitzecich, Nick. Strange Cargo: Contemporary Art As A State Of Encounter, Newcastle Region Gallery, pp. 40- 41, represented by image and text, Printed on the occasion of the touring exhibition, 2006
Reid, Michael. Linde Ivimey, Good Weekend/Sydney Morning Herald, p.17, 17 September 2005
Kiely, Annemarie. Obsessions, Belle Magazine Australia, pp. 38-42, January/February 2005
Gellatly, Kelly. Close To The Bone, Heide Museum of Modern Art Melbourne, p. 24 (Illustrated), Winter 2003
Taylor, Elena & Chandler, Rebecca. Sculpture in Focus, artonview, Issue 33, pp. 17-23, Autumn 2003
Taylor, Roger. Catalogue of a life, World Sculpture News, vol 7, no. 4, PP. 38- 41, Autumn, 2001
James, Bruce. God Moves in Mysterious Ways, Sydney Morning Herald (Spectrum), P. 2, 2 December 2000
Turley, Dir. Louise. Artists At Work: Linde Ivimey, ABC TV, First screened on ABC TV Australia, 14 August 2000

Private and public collections 

National Gallery of Australia
National Gallery of Victoria
HOTA - Home of the Arts Collection
University of Queensland Art Collection
Rockhampton Museum of Art 
Reydan Weiss Collection
Holmes à Court Collection
Hugo Collection
Keating Collection
Liz & Lloyd Horn Collection
Newcastle City Art Gallery
Waneroo City Council
Western Australia School of Art, Design & Media

Awards 
Creative Design Award, City of Perth & Challenge Bank
Gomboc Sculpture Award, Perth
Design Award, AIDS Council of WA
Friends of Dorothy Award for Sculpture, Perth
Outstanding Achievement, Channel 10 Young Achievers Award
Inaugural State Energy Commission of WA & Fremantle City Art Award

References

External links 
 

1965 births
21st-century Australian sculptors
Living people
Artists from Sydney
21st-century Australian women artists
Australian women sculptors